Annona asplundiana is a species of plant in the Annonaceae family. It is native to Peru, Ecuador and Brazil. It is considered as a vulnerable species by the IUCN.

References

Trees of Peru
asplundiana
Vulnerable plants
Trees of Ecuador
Trees of Brazil
Taxonomy articles created by Polbot
Plants described in 1947